Nyi (Gni), another transcription for Yi (I), may refer to any of several Loloish languages, such as,
Sichuan Yi language
Red Lahu language